Houston County is a county located in the central portion of the U.S. state of Georgia. The  population was 163,633 at the 2020 census. Its county seat is Perry; the city of Warner Robins is substantially larger in both area and population.

The county was created on May 15, 1821, along with 4 other counties in the state, and later reduced in size with the formation of Bibb, Crawford, Pulaski, Macon, and Peach counties. It was named after Georgia governor John Houstoun, with the spelling being a common 19th-century variation that later evolved to "Houston". The pronunciation, however, remains to this day "howston." The geographic center of the county was given the name Wattsville, which was later changed to Perry.

Houston County is included in the Warner Robins, GA Metropolitan Statistical Area, which in turn is included in the Macon-Warner Robins-Fort Valley Combined Statistical Area.  Flat Creek Public Fishing Area is in Houston County, south west of Perry.

Geography
The county is located in the upper Atlantic coastal plain region of the state.

The vast majority of Houston County is located in the Lower Ocmulgee River sub-basin of the Altamaha River basin. The very northern edge of the county, north of Centerville and Warner Robins, is located in the Upper Ocmulgee River sub-basin of the same Altamaha River basin. The very southwestern corner of Houston County, well west of Interstate 75, is located in the Middle Flint River sub-basin of the ACF River Basin (Apalachicola-Chattahoochee-Flint River Basin).

Adjacent counties
 Bibb County - north
 Peach County - west
 Twiggs County - east
 Bleckley County - southeast
 Pulaski County - south-southeast
 Dooly County - south
 Macon County - southwest

Transportation

Major highways

  Interstate 75
  U.S. Route 41
  U.S. Route 129
  U.S. Route 341
  State Route 7
  State Route 7 Spur
  State Route 11
  State Route 11 Business
  State Route 11 Connector
  State Route 26
  State Route 49
  State Route 96
  State Route 127
  State Route 224
  State Route 247
  State Route 247 Connector
  State Route 247 Spur
  State Route 329
  State Route 401 (unsigned designation for I-75)

Pedestrians and cycling

 Big Indian Creek Trail (Proposed)
 Walker's Pond Trail
 Wellston Trail
 The Walk at Sandy Run Creek

Demographics

2020 census

As of the 2020 United States census, there were 163,633 people, 58,417 households, and 39,810 families residing in the county.

2010 census
As of the 2010 United States Census, there were 139,900 people, 53,051 households, and 37,874 families residing in the county. The racial makeup of the county was 63.3% white, 28.6% black or African American, 2.4% Asian, 0.3% American Indian, 0.1% Pacific islander, 2.4% from other races, and 2.8% from two or more races. Those of Hispanic or Latino origin made up 6.1% of the population. In terms of ancestry, 12.9% were American, 10.3% were German, 10.0% were English, and 9.1% were Irish.

Of the 53,051 households, 38.7% had children under the age of 18 living with them, 50.3% were married couples living together, 16.2% had a female householder with no husband present, 28.6% were non-families, and 24.0% of all households were made up of individuals. The average household size was 2.61 and the average family size was 3.09. The median age was 34.5 years.

The median income for a household in the county was $55,098 and the median income for a family was $67,227. Males had a median income of $47,557 versus $34,239 for females. The per capita income for the county was $25,206. About 10.3% of families and 12.8% of the population were below the poverty line, including 18.7% of those under age 18 and 9.5% of those age 65 or over.

Education

Houston County Schools operates public schools.

Communities

Cities
 Byron (part)
 Centerville
 Perry
 Warner Robins

Census-designated place
 Robins Air Force Base

Unincorporated communities
 Bonaire
 Clinchfield
 Dunbar
 Elberta
 Elko
 Grovania
 Haynesville
 Kathleen

Politics
Houston County voted for conservative Democrats for most of the twentieth century, and gradually switched to voting for conservative Republicans closer to the century's end and into the twenty-first. In the 2018 gubernatorial election, while she did not carry Houston County, Stacey Abrams improved on Democratic margins in the county, improving five percent compared to Hillary Clinton's 2016 presidential run and by four percent compared to Barack Obama's 2008 run. Houston was one of five counties not carried by Abrams which improved their Democratic margins. In 2020, Joe Biden improved Democratic margins to their best since Jimmy Carter carried it in 1980. He also became the first non-Georgian Democrat to win 40 percent of the county’s vote since 1960.

See also 

 National Register of Historic Places listings in Houston County, Georgia
 Houston County Schools
List of counties in Georgia

References

External links
 
 Flint Electric Membership Corporation historical marker
 Houston County historical marker

 
Georgia (U.S. state) counties
1821 establishments in Georgia (U.S. state)
Populated places established in 1821
Warner Robins, GA Metropolitan Statistical Area